"Bros" is a song by British alternative rock band Wolf Alice. The song was originally released as a demo on 20 May 2013 through Chess Club Records, but was eventually reworked for their debut album My Love Is Cool, and was released as the second single from the album on 17 April 2015 through Dirty Hit.

Background and release
Wolf Alice originally released a demo version of "Bros" in early 2013. The song was eventually reworked to be featured on their debut album, and was announced as the second single from My Love Is Cool on 16 April 2015, and was released the following day. In an interview with NME, lead singer Ellie Rowsell described the song as "a sentimental tune to us, it's grown and changed with us over the past couple of years, taking on different shapes and forms until it evolved into being this definitive album version. It's an ode to childhood imagination and friendship and all the charm that comes with that."

Chart performance
Bros peaked at 157 on the UK Top 200 and was the only song by Wolf Alice to enter the main UK Singles chart until Don't Delete the Kisses in September 2018.

In popular culture
Turner Classic Movies used "Bros" in the Let's Movie promo. "Bros" was also used in the video game Life Is Strange: Before the Storm. It is played in the closing montage of the final episode, "Hell is Empty".

Track listing
 UK 7" release (2013)
 "Bros"
 "Every Cloud"
 UK CD single (2015)
 "Bros"
 "Bros (Instrumental)"

Personnel
Credits adapted from the liner notes of the 2013 release of "Bros".
 Wolf Alice – production, mixing
 Austen Jux-Chandler – production, engineering
 Tom Upex – production assistant, engineering assistant
 Dan Grech-Marguerat – mixing, additional programming

Charts

Certifications

References

2015 songs
2015 singles
Dirty Hit singles
Wolf Alice songs
Songs written by Ellie Rowsell